Joseph Vassallo is a Maltese-born American actor who has worked in television and film.

Vassallo has appeared in numerous plays, commercials, TV shows, along with several films. He is fluent in English, Italian, and Maltese, conversant in Swiss German and Spanish.

Background 
Vassallo was born on Malta, the firstborn of four children. At age 13, Vassallo decided to become an actor after visiting the set of Midnight Express, where his father was working as a film extra.

Vassallo attended the Teatro Manoel in Malta. After college, Vassallo worked in a hotel, then travelled in Europe and the United States.  He then worked on the Queen Elizabeth 2 as a Chef De Rang.

In the 1980s, Vassallo enrolled at the Herbert Berghof Studio in New York.  In 1987, Vassallo started training at the Stella Adler Academy and Baron Brown Studio in Los Angeles. He then spent time as the Actors Studio in Hollywood as an observer sponsored by Shelley Winters.

Acting 
Between New York and Los Angeles, Vassallo has appeared in 18 stage plays, including A Hatful of Rain, A View from the Bridge, She Stoops to Conquer, and Othello.

In the early 1990s, Vassallo appeared in a commercial for Royal Caribbean. Vassallo has since appeared in over 100 American television commercials.  Two of his Twix commercials won the Gold Award at the New York Film Festival.  Vassallo appeared in commercials for Romano's Macaroni Grill over a six-year period. 

In 1994, Vassallo appeared in the movie Blankman.  This was followed by roles in The 4th Tenor, Just Married, and My Brother Jack. In 2004, Vassallo appeared in the film Behind the Smile. In 2009, he acted in Our Family Wedding” 

Vassallo's television credits include guest appearances on Diagnosis Murder, The West Wing, Alias, and Damon, along with recurring guest roles on My Wife and Kids.

Other work 
In 2005 Vassallo was hired  as a writing consultant on the My Wife and Kids. In 2009 Vassallo, graduated from Film School in Los Angeles.  He also  worked as vice president at Way Out TV , a TV and Film Production Studio, with Damon Wayans. Vassaro has also worked as Chief Operating Officer at AKABE5, a utility and game applications curator, in Santa Monica, California. 

Starting April 7, 2017 Vassallo portrayed Enzo Ferrari at the Ferrari Land exhibit in PortAventura World, Barcelona.

References

External links

josephvassallo.com

1964 births
Actors Studio alumni
American male film actors
Maltese emigrants to the United States
Living people
Male actors from Los Angeles
American male television actors
American male stage actors